Grodno Region or Grodno Oblast or Hrodna Voblasts (Hrodzienskaja vobłasć, Haradzienščyna; , Grodnenskaya oblast;) is one of the regions of Belarus. It is located in the western part of the country.

The capital, Grodno, is the largest city in the region. It lies on the Neman River. The region borders Minsk Region to the east, Brest Region to the south, Poland (Podlaskie Voivodeship) to the west and Vitebsk Region and Lithuania (Alytus and Vilnius counties) to the north. Grodno's existence is attested to from 1127. Two castles dating from the 14th - 18th centuries are located here on the steep right bank of the Nemen. One of the city's surviving masterpieces is the 12th century Orthodox Church of St Boris & St Gleb (Kalozhskaya Church), which is the second oldest in Belarus.

History
This region was the westernmost "borderlands" of the Early East Slavs (tribal union Dregoviches?) on the lands of the Balts in the 6th-9th centuries. In the 12th-14th centuries it was part of the area sometimes known as Black Ruthenia, that was fully incorporated into the Grand Duchy of Lithuania (GDL) by the rulers of Lithuania in the 13th century.

In 1413, the area around Grodno, part of the Duchy of Trakai, was transformed into newly established Trakai Voivodeship. Grodno became the seat of Grodno County. In 1441, Magdeburg Law charter was granted to the capital by Casimir IV Jagiellon Grand Duke of Lithuania and future King of Poland. In 1444, Grodno received its coat of arms from Casimir's hands as well as substantial trade privileges.

The strong economic development of the area continued during the reign of Casimir's son - Duke Alexander Jagiellon who founded the first solid bridge over the Neman River as well as Monastery of Order of Saint Augustine and Monastery of Polish Ordo Fratrum Minorum. Later, Bona Sforza Queen of Poland and Grand Duchess of Lithuania, placed in Grodno her royal residence. According to medieval surveys, Grodno had 35 streets and 700 houses in 1558.

The golden age of Grodno falls on the reign of Stephen Báthory King of Poland, which is between 1576 and 1586. During his reign, Grodno became royal headquarters and began to host sessions of Polish–Lithuanian Commonwealth Senate and Parliament. In 1580, on king's order the castle of Grodno was rebuilt in Renaissance style of architecture, by Scoto di Parma.

At the beginning of the 17th century, Grodno was one of the most developed and important cities in Polish–Lithuanian Commonwealth, traditionally recognized as the third capital of the commonwealth. Deterioration of province status began with Livonian War which put Polish–Lithuanian Commonwealth in long-lasting and exhausting military conflict with Tsardom of Russia and Swedish Empire. Between 1765 and 1780, the province regained some of its previous status when Antoni Tyzenhaus the Treasurer of the Grand Duchy of Lithuania and Administrator of Polish Royal Estates, was governing the capital and the province. Around 50 new economical endeavours were undertaken by Tyzenhaus in the region, new manufactures, mills and workshops have been built.

As part of the Polish-Lithuanian Commonwealth forming the Grand Duchy's Trakai Voivodship, and due to subsequent Partitions of Poland, the whole of the Grodno region was finally annexed by Russian Empire by the end of 1795. The city of Grodno then became a seat for Grodno Governorate.

During World War I the governorate was occupied by Germany. German troops entered Grodno city on 3 September 1915, plundering the Library of Dominicans Order. During the German occupation, Polish citizens of Grodno region were persecuted and had restricted civil rights. At the end of the war, the Belarusian People's Republic declared its independence from Soviet Russia in March 1918 in Minsk. Grodno was the site of the last stand of the BNR's Council (Rada). Soon, the Council was forced to flee as Soviet troops invaded the region and the city in 1919. The same year Polish–Soviet War broke out and lasted until 1921.

Under the terms of Peace Treaty of Riga the region and the city returned to Second Polish Republic which claimed rights to this territory as a successor to Polish–Lithuanian Commonwealth and as a victorious side of the Polish–Soviet War. By 1939, the Grodno city had 60,000 inhabitants, with Poles and Jews accounting for 60% and 37% of the population, respectively. During Polish rule Grodno was centre of Grodno County in Białystok Voivodeship, but some parts of present Grodno Region was in the voivodeships of Nowogródek and Wilno.

After World War II started, on 17 September 1939, the Grodno area was invaded by Soviet Union and incorporated by force to the Soviet Union as part of the Byelorussian Soviet Socialist Republic. Grodno was located in the newly established Belastok Region. Thousands were imprisoned or deported to Siberia or Kazakhstan. In the early summer of 1941 the region fell under Nazi German occupation. In November 1941, German occupants established the Grodno Ghetto for Jewish citizens of Grodno and rest of the region population. In 1942, after a year of severe persecution and planned starvation of ghetto inhabitants, 10,000 Jews from Grodno were deported to the German concentration camp of Auschwitz-Birkenau and murdered there. Next year, in 1943, survivors of remaining 17,000 of ghetto inhabitants were again deported to Auschwitz-Birkenau as well as to Treblinka extermination camp and Białystok Ghetto. Although on 13 March 1943, German troops reported the end of extermination and described Grodno city as judenrein, around 50 Jews survived the extermination, also hidden by non-Jewish families. Polish and Soviet underground acted in the region. Villages like Dziarečyn, which originally had large Jewish populations, were greatly reduced.

As a result of Joseph Stalin's policy of expansion to the west, it was decided during the Yalta Conference that the Polish eastern border shall be set along the so-called "original" Curzon Line. Based on this decision, the left-bank part of Grodno town would be kept within the borders of Poland. It is actually not clear till today, how the original Curzon Line near Grodno has been moved by around 20 km to the west. When the so-called "mistake" (today regarded rather as sabotage within British ministry structures) became obvious to negotiators, Stalin refused to correct the mistaken line. Despite multiple and desperate appeals from Polish citizens of Grodno, the whole Grodno region, (including ethically Polish till today) Sapotskin Triangle, was incorporated to the Soviet Belarus and many Poles emigrated or were expelled.

In 1944 Belastok Region was dissolved and Grodno Region established.

Since 1991 the Grodno Region constitutes one of 6 regions of independent Belarus.

Heritage and tourism
Main tourist attractions in the region are numerous old architectural constructions such as castles in Mir, Lida, Novogrudok. A part of Białowieża Forest is situated here, but the tourist excursions start from the Brest Region part of the National Park. Zhyrovichy Monastery is also a destination for religious travellers.
The Mir Castle Complex and Belovezhskaya Pushcha National Park are UNESCO World Heritage Sites. There are such objects of Belarusian Cultural heritage list, as the Church of Saint Anthony of Padua in Kamienka, St. Francis Xavier Cathedral, St Andrew's Church in Slonim, Church of the Holy Trinity in Gierviaty, etc.

There are about 45 travel agencies in Grodno Region, half of them provide agent activity, the other half are tour operators.

Demographics (2002)
The province covers an area of 25,100 km² and has a population of 1,065,100, giving a population density of 42/km². About 63.5% live in cities and towns, while 36.5% live in rural areas. Females account for 53% of the region's population and men 47%. There are about 310,000 children under 19, and about 240,000 people aged over 60.

Nowadays, Belarusians account for 62.3% of the population. The region is a home to significant minority populations:

 Poles (24.8%),
 Russians (10%),
 Ukrainians (1.8%),
 Jews (0.4%),
 Tatars (0.2%),
 Lithuanians (0.2%),
 other nationalities (0.4%).

Whereas Belarus as a whole is primarily Russian Orthodox, Grodno Region has two major religions, Roman Catholic and Russian Orthodox. There are 449 religious communities and 18 denominations, 2 Russian Orthodox eparchial districts, 1 Orthodox nun sorority, 2 Catholic monk brotherhoods, 1 Catholic nun sorority, 2 Orthodox and 4 Catholic monasteries, 165 Orthodox and 169 Catholic churches. The Catholic minority is made up mostly of Poles, although the identifier "Pole" has also been historically applied to Catholic Belarusians.

There are a number on national minority associations: 6 Polish, 6 Lithuanian, 4 Jewish, 1 Ukrainian, 1 Russian, 1 Tatar, 1 Georgian, 1 Chuvash.

Administrative subdivisions
The Grodno Region is subdivided into 17 districts (rajons), 194 selsoviets, 12 cities, 6 city municipalities, and 21 urban-type settlements.

Districts of Grodno Region 

 Ashmyany District
 Astravyets District
 Byerastavitsa District
 Dzyatlava District
 Grodno (Hrodna) District
 Iwye District
 Karelichy District
 Lida District
 Masty District
 Navahrudak District
 Shchuchyn District
 Slonim District
 Smarhon' District
 Svislach District
 Vawkavysk District
 Voranava District
 Zel’va District

Cities and towns

Population of cities and towns in Grodno Region:

Economy

In 2016, Grodno Region produced 10.9% of industrial output of Belarus. The biggest company was a nitrogen fertilizer producer Grodno Azot (16% of regional industrial output). In 2017, the biggest taxpayer of the region was Grodno tobacco factory.

Average salary (before income tax) in the region in 2017 was 700 BYN, or lower than average salary in Belarus (820 BYN). The highest salary in the region was recorded in Grodno (810 BYN).

Unemployment rate in 2017 was estimated at 4.4%, but only 0.8% of population of employable age was registered as unemployed.

See also
Subdivisions of Belarus
Second Polish Republic’s Nowogródek Voivodeship (1919-1939)
Second Polish Republic’s Białystok Voivodeship (1919–1939)
Second Polish Republic’s Wilno Voivodeship (1926–39)
Grodno is one of the most ancient towns in Belarus.

References

External links

Grodno Regional Executive Committee , in Belarusian, Russian, English and Chinese

 
Regions of Belarus